Stem Beach is an unincorporated community Pueblo County, Colorado, south of Pueblo. The community is the location of the Stem Beach exit (exit 91) on both north and southbound Interstate 25. A retail cannabis store is located in Stem Beach, on the west side of the freeway, and the Vestas manufacturing facility is located east of the interstate on Tower Road.

Name
The name Stem Beach comes from the beaches at two reservoirs (Saint Charles Reservoir Number 2 and Saint Charles Reservoir Number 3) in the community. Reeds with prominent stems grow along the reservoirs' beaches.

See also
Saint Charles Reservoir

References

Unincorporated communities in Pueblo County, Colorado